Leningradskaya station is a Russian (formerly Soviet) Antarctic research station, located in the northern shore of Victoria Land, at the Oates Coast. It was opened on February 25, 1971 by the members of the 15th Soviet Antarctic Expedition.  It closed in 1991, but during its lifetime was host to studies of meteorology, Earth magnetism, oceanology and glaciology.

In February 2006, Valeriy Lukin, the head of the Russian Antarctic Expedition (RAE), said:

See also
 List of Antarctic research stations
 List of Antarctic field camps
 Soviet Antarctic Expedition

References

External links
 Official website Arctic and Antarctic Research Institute
 AARI Leningradskaya Station
 COMNAP Antarctic Facilities
 COMNAP Antarctic Facilities Map

Outposts of Antarctica
Soviet Union and the Antarctic
Russia and the Antarctic
1971 establishments in Antarctica
1991 disestablishments in Antarctica
2007 establishments in Antarctica